Julien Ingrassia (born 26 November 1979) is a retired French rally co-driver. Working with Sébastien Ogier, he became World Rally Champion in 2013, 2014, 2015, and 2016 with Volkswagen Motorsport, 2017 and 2018 with M-Sport World Rally Team, and in 2020 and 2021 with Toyota Gazoo Racing WRT.

Rally career

While starting his professional life as a salesman, Julien Ingrassia discovered rallying and made his debut as a codriver in 2002 in France's Critérium des Cévennes. For several years, he gained experience in regional rallies, and then competed in the Peugeot 206 Cup in 2004.

At the end of 2005, he attended the Rallye Jeunes selection organised by the French Federation and discovered Sébastien Ogier, winner that year. They teamed up for the 2006 season in the Rallye Jeunes FFSA team and Julien codrived Sébastien for his first rallies and his first wins in the Peugeot 206 Cup. Together, they learnt their work in regional and national rallies and then quickly entered the international scene.

J-WRC World Champion (2008)

In 2008, Julien Ingrassia reached the world level through the Junior World Rally Championship with the FFSA French team. Winner of three of the season's six rallies, he won the JWRC title with Sébastien Ogier. Seen as the new generation of French rallying talents, the crew only contested one season in JWRC before moving up to the WRC.

WRC (2009-2021)

Citroën (2009-2011)

Joining the Citroën Junior Team in 2009, Julien Ingrassia scored his first podium finish at the Acropolis Rally together with Sébastien Ogier. A first win came the following season, in Portugal. Promoted in the official Citroën Total World Rally Team for the last gravel rallies of the 2010 season, the crew took a second win in Japan, a rally that they were discovering.

Despite his late arrival in motorsport, it only took Julien Ingrassia two seasons in the WRC class together with Sébastien Ogier to star at the highest level of rallying. In 2011, the Ogier/Ingrassia crew was full-time part of the factory Citroën team, winning as many rallies as their team-mates Loeb/Elena (5), despite team's orders in favour of Loeb at the end of the season.

Volkswagen (2012-2016)

After their departure from Citroën, Julien Ingrassia and Sébastien Ogier linked up with Volkswagen Motorsport in 2012, choosing the German manufacturer instead of Ford: this meant skipping the 2012 WRC championship in order to fully develop the new Polo R WRC, but they indeed experienced a very busy year in 2012, competing in almost the entire season at the wheel of a Skoda Fabia S2000 while developing the new car for 2013. The Polo R WRC was ready at the end of the year and was on the start line at the 2013 Rally Monte Carlo. First special stage and first win! Ogier and Ingrassia ended the weekend on the podium, and then went on to win Rally Sweden, a real accomplishment given the Scandinavians' hegemony on their home ground. Now leaders of the season, the French crew consolidated their domination rally after rally: they scored 9 victories, 111 fastest times and no less than 290 points, a record in WRC! They secured their first WRC title in the first stage of Rallye France, while Volkswagen took also the manufacturers title on the following round in Spain.

In 2014, the reigning World Champions got off to a perfect start by winning Rally Monte Carlo. After already winning this prestigious rally when it was part of the IRC championship in 2009, this was the first time they achieved this success in the WRC class. Also victorious in Mexico, Portugal, Italy, Poland, Australia, Spain and Wales, Julien Ingrassia and Sébastien Ogier clinched their second title on the penultimate round of the season. Ingrassia became the first French co-driver to have won two WRC titles. With a total of 24 victories in five seasons, he was also at that time the third most successful co-driver in the WRC (tied with Luís Moya, who retired in 2002), behind Timo Rautiainen (30) and Daniel Elena (78).

The French pair remained with Volkswagen in 2015 and won again the championship, thanks to eight rally wins and nine Power Stages maximum points taken during the season, this despite new rules that made it difficult for the championship leaders to open the road during the first two legs of each rally.

With unchanged regulations for 2016, Julien Ingrassia and Sébastien Ogier made it four titles in a row with six new wins to their credit. They won the championship in Spain and went on to celebrate Volkswagen's manufacturers' title in Wales, before the German manufacturer's surprise announcement that it was withdrawing from WRC.

M-Sport (2017–2018)

A month later, the World Champions were announced at M-Sport for 2017. They began that new challenge with a victory at Rallye Monte-Carlo and then confirmed their leadership with nine podiums and another win in Portugal. They won the title at the penultimate rally of the season, beating rivals Thierry Neuville and Ott Tänak in the championship.

The duo remained another year with M-Sport. Yet again, they kicked off the championship with a victory at Rallye Monte-Carlo, the sixth for them and fifth in a row, which is a record for this legendary rally. After winning also in Mexico and France, the rest of the season was less successful for them, to the point that they were only third in the championship three rounds from the end, behind Thierry Neuville and Ott Tänak. But Sébastien Ogier and Julien Ingrassia won Wales Rally GB, regained the championship lead in the following rally and then ended Rally Australia with their sixth title.

Return to Citroën (2019)

Seven years after their collaboration ended, Sébastien Ogier and Julien Ingrassia were back in Citroën for 2019. For the sixth time in a row, they began the season with a win at Rallye Monte-Carlo, after an intense duel with Thierry Neuville and Nicolas Gilsoul and a gap of just 2.2 at the end, the smallest in the event's history. After a more complicated Rally Sweden, the pair put in a strong performance on the first gravel rally of the season, in Mexico, collecting the maximum possible points with the rally win and the best time in the Power Stage. Despite another win in Turkey, it was a season of ups and lows with the C3 WRC and they ended third overall. The crew then left Citroën and signed up with Toyota Gazoo Racing for 2020.

Toyota (2020-2021)

For the first time in six years, they were beaten at Rally Monte Carlo, but scored their first win in the Toyota Yaris WRC in Mexico, which took place in early March. While the Covid-19 pandemic began to break out, the event was cut short and the championship went into an enforced six-month break. As the season resumed with new events, Ingrassia and Ogier won the Monza Rally that rounded off a shortened season and clinched their seventh world title, all of them set with three manufacturers.

The French pair re-signed for a final year, this time more complete. The first half was very strong, with four wins in six rallies, including a successful first visit to the legendary Safari Rally.

On 7 October, Julien Ingrassia announced his decision to end his career as a co-driver at the end of the 2021 season after 16 seasons alongside Sébastien Ogier.

Stats

Titles

Victories

WRC victories 
{|class="wikitable"
!  # 
! Event
! Season
! Driver
! Car
|-
| 1
|  44th Vodafone Rally de Portugal
| 2010
|  Sébastien Ogier
| Citroën C4 WRC
|-
| 2
|  6th Rally Japan
| 2010
|  Sébastien Ogier
| Citroën C4 WRC
|-
| 3
|  45th Vodafone Rally de Portugal
| 2011
|  Sébastien Ogier
| Citroën DS3 WRC
|-
| 4
|  29th Jordan Rally
| 2011
|  Sébastien Ogier
| Citroën DS3 WRC
|-
| 5
|  57th Acropolis Rally
| 2011
|  Sébastien Ogier
| Citroën DS3 WRC
|-
| 6
|  29th ADAC Rallye Deutschland
| 2011
|  Sébastien Ogier
| Citroën DS3 WRC
|-
| 7
|  2nd Rallye de France-Alsace
| 2011
|  Sébastien Ogier
| Citroën DS3 WRC
|-
| 8
|  61st Rally Sweden
| 2013
|  Sébastien Ogier
| Volkswagen Polo R WRC
|-
| 9
|  27th Rally Guanajuato México
| 2013
|  Sébastien Ogier
| Volkswagen Polo R WRC
|-
| 10
|  47th Rally de Portugal
| 2013
|  Sébastien Ogier
| Volkswagen Polo R WRC
|-
| 11
|  10th Rally di Sardegna
| 2013
|  Sébastien Ogier
| Volkswagen Polo R WRC
|-
| 12
|  63rd Neste Oil Rally Finland
| 2013
|  Sébastien Ogier
| Volkswagen Polo R WRC
|-
| 13
|  22nd Rally Australia
| 2013
|  Sébastien Ogier
| Volkswagen Polo R WRC
|-
| 14
|  4th Rallye de France-Alsace
| 2013
|  Sébastien Ogier
| Volkswagen Polo R WRC
|-
| 15
|  49th Rally RACC Catalunya – Costa Daurada
| 2013
|  Sébastien Ogier
| Volkswagen Polo R WRC
|-
| 16
|  69th Wales Rally GB
| 2013
|  Sébastien Ogier
| Volkswagen Polo R WRC
|-
| 17
|  82nd Rallye Automobile Monte-Carlo
| 2014
|  Sébastien Ogier
| Volkswagen Polo R WRC
|-
| 18
|  28th Rally Guanajuato México
| 2014
|  Sébastien Ogier
| Volkswagen Polo R WRC
|-
| 19
|  48th Vodafone Rally de Portugal
| 2014
|  Sébastien Ogier
| Volkswagen Polo R WRC
|-
| 20
|  11th Rally di Sardegna
| 2014
|  Sébastien Ogier
| Volkswagen Polo R WRC
|-
| 21
|  71st LOTOS Rally Poland
| 2014
|  Sébastien Ogier
| Volkswagen Polo R WRC
|-
| 22
|  23rd Coates Hire Rally Australia
| 2014
|  Sébastien Ogier
| Volkswagen Polo R WRC
|-
| 23
|  50th Rally RACC Catalunya – Costa Daurada
| 2014
|  Sébastien Ogier
| Volkswagen Polo R WRC
|-
| 24
|  70th Wales Rally GB
| 2014
|  Sébastien Ogier
| Volkswagen Polo R WRC
|-
| 25
|  83rd Rallye Automobile Monte-Carlo
| 2015
|  Sébastien Ogier
| Volkswagen Polo R WRC
|-
| 26
|  63rd Rally Sweden
| 2015
|  Sébastien Ogier
| Volkswagen Polo R WRC
|-
| 27
|  29th Rally Guanajuato México
| 2015
|  Sébastien Ogier
| Volkswagen Polo R WRC
|-
| 28
|  12° Rally d'Italia Sardegna
| 2015
|  Sébastien Ogier
| Volkswagen Polo R WRC
|-
| 29
|  72nd LOTOS Rally Poland
| 2015
|  Sébastien Ogier
| Volkswagen Polo R WRC
|-
| 30
|  33rd Rallye Deutschland
| 2015
|  Sébastien Ogier
| Volkswagen Polo R WRC
|-
| 31
|  24th Rally Australia
| 2015
|  Sébastien Ogier
| Volkswagen Polo R WRC
|-
| 32
|  71st Wales Rally GB
| 2015
|  Sébastien Ogier
| Volkswagen Polo R WRC
|-
| 33
|  84th Rallye Automobile Monte-Carlo
| 2016
|  Sébastien Ogier
| Volkswagen Polo R WRC
|-
| 34
|  64th Rally Sweden
| 2016
|  Sébastien Ogier
| Volkswagen Polo R WRC
|-
| 35
|  34th Rally Germany
| 2016
|  Sébastien Ogier
| Volkswagen Polo R WRC
|-
| 36
|  60th Rally France
| 2016
|  Sébastien Ogier
| Volkswagen Polo R WRC
|-
| 37
|  52nd Rally RACC Catalunya – Costa Daurada
| 2016
|  Sébastien Ogier
| Volkswagen Polo R WRC
|-
| 38
|  72nd Wales Rally GB
| 2016
|  Sébastien Ogier
| Volkswagen Polo R WRC
|-
| 39
|  85th Rallye Automobile Monte-Carlo
| 2017
|  Sébastien Ogier
| Ford Fiesta WRC
|-
| 40
|  51° Vodafone Rally de Portugal
| 2017
|  Sébastien Ogier
| Ford Fiesta WRC
|-
| 41
|  86th Automobile Rallye Monte-Carlo
| 2018
|  Sébastien Ogier
| Ford Fiesta WRC
|-
| 42
|  32nd Rally Guanajuato México
| 2018
|  Sébastien Ogier
| Ford Fiesta WRC
|-
| 43
|  61ème Tour de Corse – Rallye de France
| 2018
|  Sébastien Ogier
| Ford Fiesta WRC
|-
| 44
|  74th Wales Rally GB
| 2018
|  Sébastien Ogier
| Ford Fiesta WRC
|-
| 45
|  87ème Rallye Automobile Monte-Carlo
| 2019
|  Sébastien Ogier
| Citroën C3 WRC
|-
| 46
|  33rd Rally Guanajuato México
| 2019
|  Sébastien Ogier
| Citroën C3 WRC
|-
| 47
|  12th Rally Turkey
| 2019
|  Sébastien Ogier
| Citroën C3 WRC
|-
| 48
|  34th Rally Guanajuato México
| 2020
|  Sébastien Ogier
| Toyota Yaris WRC
|-
| 49
|  ACI Rally Monza
| 2020
|  Sébastien Ogier
| Toyota Yaris WRC
|-
|50
|  89ème Rallye Automobile Monte-Carlo
| 2021
|  Sébastien Ogier
| Toyota Yaris WRC
|-
|51
|  1st Croatia Rally
| 2021
|  Sébastien Ogier
| Toyota Yaris WRC
|-
|52
|  18th Rally Italia Sardegna 
| 2021
|  Sébastien Ogier
| Toyota Yaris WRC
|-
|53
|  68th Safari Rally 
| 2021
|  Sébastien Ogier
| Toyota Yaris WRC
|-
|54
|   ACI Rally Monza
|  2021
|   Sébastien Ogier
|  Toyota Yaris WRC
|}

JWRC victories

IRC Victories

{|class="wikitable"
!  # 
! Event
! Season
! Driver
! Car
|-
| 1
|  77th Rallye Monte-Carlo
| 2009
|  Sébastien Ogier
| Peugeot 207 S2000
|}

Other victories

World rally championship records 

 Win with the slightest margin: 0.2 seconds on Jari-Matti Latvala at the Rally Jordan, 16 April 2011
 Stage wins rate in one season: 46.25% (111 wins out of 240 stages)
 Stages as a leader in one season: 62.92% (151 SS as a leader out of 240 stages)
 Points scored in one season: 290 pts in the 2013 World Rally Championship
 Most codrivers' championship points overall: 2511 (2008–)

Rally records

WRC results

Complete WRC results

Complete JWRC results

Full results in WRC 

(*) including one ex-aequo stage win
(**) including two ex-aequo stage wins
(****) including four ex-aequo stage wins
(*****) including five ex-aequo stage wins

IRC results

References

External links 

 
 
 Julien-Ingrassia on ewrc-results.com 1
 Julien-Ingrassia (driver) on ewrc-results.com 2

1979 births
Sportspeople from Aix-en-Provence
Living people
French rally drivers
French rally co-drivers
French people of Italian descent
World Rally Championship co-drivers